Shenipsit may refer to:

Shenipsit State Forest, Connecticut
Shenipsit Trail, Connecticut
Shenipsit Lake, Connecticut